Peck Gulch is a valley in the U.S. state of Oregon.

Peck Gulch was named in 1876 after one Henry Peck.

References

Landforms of Jackson County, Oregon
Valleys of Oregon